The 1964 Polish Speedway season was the 1964 season of motorcycle speedway in Poland.

Individual

Polish Individual Speedway Championship
The 1964 Individual Speedway Polish Championship was held on 27 September at Rybnik.

Golden Helmet
The 1964 Golden Golden Helmet organised by the Polish Motor Union (PZM) was the 1964 event for league's leading riders.

Calendar

Final classification
Note: Result from final score was subtracted with two the weakest events.

Team

Team Speedway Polish Championship
The 1964 Team Speedway Polish Championship was the 17th edition of the Team Polish Championship. Górnik Rybnik won the gold medal for the third consecutive season.

First League

Second League

Two year tables
An additional award was given to the team that topped the league tables over a two year period.

First League 1963-64

Second League 1963-64

References

Poland Individual
Poland Team
Speedway
1964 in Polish speedway